Dyogo Henrique de Oliveira (born 29 May 1975) is a Brazilian economist and former minister of Planning, Budget and Management in the government of Michel Temer, who assumed the office temporarily after the departure of senator Romero Jucá. In 31 March 2017, he was confirmed as minister. In March 2018, Oliveira was confirmed by president Temer as the new president of the Brazilian Development Bank (BNDES).

References

|-

1975 births
Living people
Brazilian economists
Government ministers of Brazil
University of Brasília alumni